Hetty Broedelet-Henkes (1878–1949) was a Dutch painter known for her still lifes.

Biography
Broedelet-Henkes née Henkes was born on 18 January 1877 in Delfshaven. She studied at Akademie van beeldende kunsten (Den Haag) (Royal Academy of Art, The Hague). She was a member of the Pulchri Studio and Schilderessenvereniging Odis (The Hague). She was married to fellow artist  (1872-1936). Broedelet-Henkes' work was included in the 1939 exhibition and sale Onze Kunst van Heden (Our Art of Today) at the Rijksmuseum in Amsterdam. Broedelet-Henkes died on 2 January 1966  in Deventer.

References

External links
images of Broedelet-Henkes' work on RKD

1870s births
1966 deaths
Painters from Rotterdam
20th-century Dutch women artists
Dutch women painters